The effects associated with divorce affect the couple’s children in both the short and the long term.  After divorce the couple often experience effects including, decreased levels of happiness, change in economic status, and emotional problems. The effects on children include academic, behavioral, and psychological problems.  Studies suggest that children from divorced families are more likely to exhibit such behavioral issues than those from non-divorced families.

Effect on children 
A longitudinal study by Judith Wallerstein reports long-term negative effects of divorce on children.

Linda Waite analyzed the relation between marriage, divorce and happiness using the National Survey of Family and Households and found that unhappily married families who had divorced were no happier than those who had stayed together. One broad-based study also shows that people have an easier time recovering after the death of a parent as opposed to a divorce. This study reported that children who lose a parent are usually able to attain the same level of happiness that they had before the death, whereas children of divorced parents often are not able to attain the same level of happiness that they had before the divorce.

A child affected by divorce at an early age will show effects later in life. [Abmedrano2023] Children can be affected socially, they may seem to become defiant in certain aspects. In heavy research, many have seen children become isolated after experiencing their parents' divorce. Children soon decide they should start growing up much quicker than they need to due to the amount of stress they have taken on, as unfortunate as it sounds it does happen often.  They may make premature transitions to adulthood such as leave home or parent their own child early. It is believed that this type of attitude and actions occur due to the children feeling they are the reason as to why their parents split. Divorce is not just affecting the two individuals married to one another, it is a family situation and must be talked about more. Recent authors have argued that a major cost to children comes long after: when they attempt to form stable marriages themselves.  Parental divorce leads a child to have lower trust in future relationships. Compared with children of always married parents, children of divorced parents have more positive attitudes towards divorce  and less favorable attitudes towards marriage.

The children of divorced parents have also been reported more likely to have behavioral problems than children of married parents and are more likely to suffer abuse than children in intact families.

In contrast to the usual negative views on marriage by children affected by it, Constance Ahrons, in We're Still Family: What Grown Children Have to Say About Their Parents' Divorce, interviewed 98 divorced families' children for numerous subjects found a few of the children saying, "I saw some of the things my parents did and know not to do that in my marriage and see the way they treated each other and know not to do that to my spouse and my children. I know [the divorce] has made me more committed to my husband and my children." In the book For Better or For Worse: Divorce Reconsidered, Mavis Hetherington reports that not all kids fare so badly, and that divorce can actually help children living in high-conflict homes such as those with domestic violence. A peaceful divorce has less of an impact on children than a contested divorce.

Contrary to some of the previous research, those with divorced parents were no more likely than those from intact families to regard divorce positively or to see it as an easy way of solving the problem of a failing marriage. Members of both groups felt that divorce should be avoided, but that it was also a necessary option when a relationship could not be rescued. A study from Wolfinger, N. H. (2011). Titled: “More Evidence for Trends in the Intergenerational Transmission of Divorce”, attempted to understand the validity of this socially held claim. In essence, the study attempts to find evidence as to whether divorce transmission (or the likeliness of a child of divorce being a higher predictor or personal divorce) is still relevant in today’s climate. Their research uses data from the General Social Survey (GSS) (Davis & Smith 2007). To randomize the research an adult was chosen from each home between the ages of 18-89. Data was collected between the years of 1973-1994 and individuals were chosen only if 30 years had passed since they were initially married, which ended up being a sample of 7,226 individuals. Interestingly the study finds “clear evidence of a decline in divorce transmission.” And “Demonstrates that divorced people die younger; it has also been shown that parental divorce decreases life expectancy.” (Wolfinger, 2011). These findings also support claims made in the mortality section. However, the study did show that “the divorce cycle is strongest for people who experience multiple family structure transitions in their families of origin” (p. 1). Or rather, recurring parental divorces. To summarize, divorce transmission according to this study, is in-fact generally declining. Where there is exposure to multiple divorces however, we see an increased rate of transmission.

A 2015 article updated and confirmed the findings in a 2002 article in Clinical Child and Family Psychology Review. Both articles discuss a variety of health consequences for children of divorced parents. Studies have claimed that people who have been in divorced families have higher rates of alcoholism and other substance abuse compared to those who have never been divorced. Robert H. Coombs, Professor of Behavioral Sciences at UCLA, reviewed over 130 studies measuring how marital status affects personal well-being. Researchers have also shown that children of divorced or separated parents:

 Have higher rates of clinical depression – Family disruption and low socioeconomic status in early childhood increase the long-term risk for major depression.
 Seek formal psychiatric care at higher rates.
 In the case of men, are more likely to die by suicide and have lower life expectancies.
 Acute infectious diseases, digestive illnesses, parasitic diseases, respiratory illnesses, and severe injuries.
 Cancer – Married cancer patients are also more likely to recover than divorced ones.
 Stroke.  
 Heart problems. 
 Rheumatoid arthritis and osteoarthritis. 
 Increased risk of arthritis for children later in life.
Lower levels of the hormone oxytocin in adulthood.

Uncontested divorce 
An uncontested divorce is a divorce decree that neither party is fighting. Over 40% of American children will experience parental divorce or separation during their childhood. In a study of the effect of relocation after a divorce, researchers found that parents relocating far away from each other (with either both moving or one moving) has a long-term effect on children.  Researchers found major differences in divorced families in which one parent moved away from the child; the children (as college students) received less financial support from their parents compared with divorced families in which neither parent moved.  The children also felt more distress related to the divorce and did not feel a sense of emotional support from their parents. A parental divorce influences a child’s behavior in a negative manner that leads to anger, frustration, and depression. This negative behavior is cast outward in their academic and personal life. Relocating is defined as when a parent moves more than an hour away from their children. Children of divorces where both parents stayed close together did not have these negative effects.

Mortality & Divorce 
In a study titled “Divorce and Death: Forty Years of the Charleston Heart Study.” The impact of divorce on the adult lifespan following separation is explored. To achieve this the research team surveyed a sample of more than 1,300 adults which were periodically checked in on between 1960 and 2000. According to Sbarra (2009) the study found that: "participants who were separated or divorced at the start of the study evidenced significantly elevated rates of early mortality, and these results held after adjusting for baseline health status and other demographic variables." These findings suggest that a key predictor of early death is the amount of time people live as a recipient of divorce. Let it be noted that mortality was not as negatively affected if the individual remarried. This article (although stand-alone) may hold value, as it expresses the physiological impacts of divorce on the individual, which literally resolve into diminished lifespans.

See also
 Divorce
 Fear of commitment
 Cost of raising a child
 Single person

References 

Divorce